The French Battalion of the United Nations Organisation (or BF-ONU) was a battalion of volunteers made up of active and reserve French military personnel sent to the Korean Peninsula as part of the UN force fighting in the Korean War.

Korea
Lieutenant General Raoul Magrin-Vernerey, better known under his nom de guerre, Monclar, Inspector of the French Foreign Legion and a hero of World War II, supported Chief of Staff of the French Army General Clément Blanc's decision to form a volunteer force and agreed to command the new unit, accepting a demotion back to the rank of lieutenant-colonel. The French Battalion arrived in Pusan, South Korea on November 29, 1950, and was placed under the operational control of the U.S. 23rd Infantry Regiment, 2nd Infantry Division. Despite initial fears about French forces being "on the rout", the battalion carried out several successful early actions and earned the respect of General Matthew Ridgway, commander of the U.S. Eighth Army.

From January 7–12, 1951, the French Battalion participated in the First and Second Battle of Wonju where it stopped the North Korean advance. It was followed by the Battle of the Twin Tunnels (February 1–2, 1951) and of Chipyong-ni (February 3–16, 1951). These battles, during which the battalion resisted the attacks of four Chinese divisions for three days, allowed the 8th Army to score a victorious counter-offensive. Three weeks later, the battalion was engaged in combat for Hill 1037 (about 50 miles east of Seoul) and lost 40 dead and 200 wounded while attacking and capturing the hill.

In the spring of 1951, the battalion crossed the 38th parallel into the Hwacheon region. The destruction of an engineering platoon led to a partial rout of the French Battalion. However, it allowed U.S. forces to stop the new Chinese offensive. In the fall of 1951, the French took part in the Battle of Heartbreak Ridge. In the course of these combats which lasted a month, 60 French soldiers were killed and 200 were wounded. In the fall of 1952, after a lethal war of positions, similar to the Battle of Verdun during World War I, the battalion put a halt in Chongwon, South Korea, to a Chinese offensive toward Seoul. This resistance resulted in 47 dead and 144 wounded. The total Chinese losses against the French battalion were estimated at 2000 men. In the winter and the spring of 1953, the battalion took part in battles which kept the North Korean and Chinese forces from reaching Seoul.

After the signing of the Korean Armistice Agreement in July 1953, the French Battalion left Korea with five French Citations to the Order of the Army; the French Fourragère in the colors of the Military Medal; two Korean Presidential Citations; and three American Distinguished Unit Citations. Forty-four of the French casualties were eventually buried at the United Nations Memorial Cemetery in Busan, South Korea.

In an address to a joint session of the United States Congress on 22 May 1952, General Ridgway said the following:

One member of the French Battalion, Louis Misseri, was awarded the Distinguished Service Cross by the United States for his actions. His citation reads:

Paul L. Freeman Jr., the commander of the 23rd Infantry Regiment, said of the French Battalion:

Post Korea

During their service in Indochina, the unit (under its new title of Le Regiment de Corée) participated in the brutal Battle of Mang Yang Pass along Route coloniale 19 in June and July 1954, where it suffered heavy casualties. Between its arrival in Indochina and the cease-fire on July 20, 1954, the 1st Battalion suffered 238 killed or wounded, and the 2nd Battalion 202 killed or wounded. In addition, 34 Indochinese assigned to the battalion were killed in action. On September 1, 1954, the Regiment de Corée was disbanded and reduced to battalion size. The battalion remained in Indochina until July 17, 1955, when it embarked from Saigon to Algeria to participate in the suppression of the ongoing insurrection.

On August 10, 1955, the battalion landed in Algiers and began a series of garrison and search-and-destroy operations in the Constantine Department.  On September 1, 1960, the battalion was amalgamated with the 156th Infantry Regiment and received the designation of 156 Régiment d'Infanterie- Régiment de Corée.  All told, the regiment suffered 48 killed in action in Algeria.  The regiment was repatriated to France after the Évian Accords and disbanded upon its return to France in 1962.

See also
 Military history of France
  French participation in the Korean War Forces françaises dans la guerre de Corée

References

Further reading

External links

French Army "Docrine" Magazine #11, April 2007 article called The UN-Assigned French Battalion in Korea
French Participation in the Korean War
UN Participation in the Korean War – Korean War Educator
 Souvenirs de Corée avec le Bataillon Français de l'O.N.U.

Infantry battalions of France
Military units and formations of the First Indochina War
Recipients of the Presidential Unit Citation (United States)
Military history of France during the Korean War
French Fourth Republic
France
France–Korea relations
Military units and formations established in 1950
Military units and formations disestablished in 1953
Battalions of the Korean War
France–United States relations